Brookins is both a surname and a given name. Notable people with the name include:

People with the surname Brookins 
Howard B. Brookins Sr. (born 1932), American politician
Howard Brookins, American politicians
Jonathan Brookins, MMA fighter
Richard Brookins (1922–2018), the "American St. Nick" and soldier during World War II
Sanford Augustus Brookins (1877–1968), American architect and builder 
Walter Brookins (1889–1953), American aviator

People with the given name Brookins 
Brookins Campbell (1808–1853), American politician